Mustafa Ali (born 1986) is an American professional wrestler.

Mustafa Ali may also refer to:

Mustafa Ali (historian) (1541–1600), Ottoman historian
Mustafa Ali (born 1944), politician born in 1944 in Malaya
Mustafa Ali, Cyprus Police Force officer and 1953 New Year Honours recipient of a Colonial Police Medal
Mustafa Ali, commander of auxiliary troops in the aftermath of the Battle of Ab Darrah Pass, in 1511
Mostafa Ali, Bangladeshi politician

See also
Ali Mustafa (disambiguation)
Mustafa Abu Ali (1940–2009), Palestinian filmmaker